Wolfgang Karl Härdle (born October 20, 1953 in Darmstadt) is a German statistician and University Professor at the Faculty of Economics of the Humboldt University of Berlin.

Education and career 
Härdle was born as the son of a master glazier and a post office employee and grew up in Gaggenau, where he graduated from the Goethe Gymnasium in 1972. According to his own genealogical research, he is a distant descendant of the mathematician and physicist Carl Friedrich Gauss.

After studying mathematics at the University of Karlsruhe, he has devoted himself to statistical research and teaching since obtaining his mathematics diploma in 1978. He is a specialist in semiparametric and nonparametric estimation methods. In 1982 he received his doctorate in natural sciences from the Heidelberg University under Theodor Gasser. In 1988, he completed his habilitation in statistics and econometrics at the University of Bonn. In 1989, he went to the Université catholique de Louvain as a guest scientist, then as an associate professor. Since 1992, he has been a professor at the Faculty of Economics at the Humboldt University of Berlin. He is the director of the international DFG graduate program IRTG 1792 "High Dimensional Non Stationary Time Series", which has been in existence since 2013.

Personal life 
Härdle has three children with his wife, who is a cartography engineer.

In addition to his research, Härdle founded the company MD*Tech, which developed and distributed the statistical software XploRe.

Refences 

1953 births
Karlsruhe Institute of Technology alumni
Heidelberg University alumni
Academic staff of the Humboldt University of Berlin
Academic staff of the University of Bonn
Academic staff of the Université catholique de Louvain
German statisticians
People from Darmstadt
Living people